Ostroukhov is a rural locality (a khutor) in Slashchyovskoye Rural Settlement, Kumylzhensky District, Volgograd Oblast, Russia. The population was 346 as of 2010. There are 15 streets.

Geography 
Ostroukhov is located in forest steppe, on Khopyorsko-Buzulukskaya Plain, on the bank of the Khopyor River, 28 km southwest of Kumylzhenskaya (the district's administrative centre) by road. Devkin is the nearest rural locality.

References 

Rural localities in Kumylzhensky District